Bill Graham (1951 – 11 May 1996) was an Irish journalist and author. He attended Blackrock College and  Trinity College, Dublin and resided in Howth. In addition to authoring several books, Graham wrote for Hot Press magazine from its founding. He died of a heart attack at forty-four on 11 May 1996 being survived by his mother Eileen.

Graham's long time colleague and Hot Press editor Niall Stokes described him: "In many ways, he was a founding father of modern Irish music. He inspired a whole generation of Irish fans and musicians to look at the world in a different and broader light. And he was good on more than music too. He felt a kinship with Northern Ireland and the people on both sides of the sectarian and political divide there that was unusual in those who were brought up within the narrow confines of the culture of Ireland in the '60s and '70s – and his political writing reflected this. And he was also ahead of the game in terms of his appreciation of the importance of the politics of food and the position of the developing world in the new era."

Graham was instrumental in the formation of Irish rock band U2, having brought them to the attention of their manager Paul McGuinness. At a recent exhibition of early group photos, McGuinness remembered the role Bill Graham played by introducing him to the band. Despite being widely known as the man who "discovered" U2, it was a title he disavowed. He wrote enthusiastically about the band, giving them their first exposure. Both guitarist The Edge and Bono have explained Graham's role in the band's development.

John Waters observed that "It is often said that Bill 'discovered' U2. This is untrue. Bill created U2, through his enthusiasm for them. He gave them a reflection of their own possibilities and they only looked back that once"...
He had a "deep knowledge of virtually every form of popular and roots music... and Waters goes on to credit him as 'the first Irish writer to write about the connection between Irish political culture and Irish rock'n'roll'.

Books 
Book written by Graham include Enya: The Latest Score, U2: In the name of love : a history and Complete Guide to the Music of U2.

Influence 
A number of music critics/journalists have cited Graham as a primary influence, in some cases suggesting they got into the field as a direct result of his writing, e.g. Jim Carroll, Irish Times, June 2012–

"I blame it all on Bill Graham, the brilliant Hot Press writer who sadly waltzed off this mortal coil in 1996. I blame dear old Bill for lots of things. I'll be honest: without him, I probably would never have been a music writer in the first place and you wouldn't be reading this. I used to say that to wind him up when we'd meet and he'd groan aloud. I mean, there are a lot of things to carry the rap for and the shit I've written over the years is a damn heavy burden to bear....
Bill's feature took my breath away. Here was someone writing with an unsurpassed degree of passion, fervour, belief, enthusiasm, knowledge and depth about one of my favourite bands. I must have read that piece about a hundred times. I had already heard the big music, but now I'd seen the big picture. I had found my career. And I had found the fever."

His funeral drew many of biggest bands from the world of Irish music including Clannad, Altan, U2 and Hothouse Flowers, along with singers Simon Carmody and Gavin Friday.

See also

 List of writers on popular music
 Timeline of U2

References

External links 
 Bill Graham articles on Hotpress

Irish journalists
Irish writers
Irish columnists
1951 births
1996 deaths
People from Howth
People educated at Blackrock College
20th-century journalists